The 2019–20 Bahraini Premier League (also known as Nasser Bin Hamad Premier League for sponsorship reasons), is the 63rd top-level football season in Bahrain. The season started on 13 September 2019, and ended on 19 October 2020.

Team location

League table

Relegation play-off

1st Leg

2nd Leg

''Busaiteen retained Premier League survival 4:2 on aggregate

Results

Season statistics

Top scorers

References

Bahraini Premier League seasons
1
Bahrain
Bahraini Premier League, 2019-20